The first season of 90210, an American television series, began on September 2, 2008. Gabe Sachs and Jeff Judah are executive producers for the first season, after original producer Rob Thomas dropped out to focus on other projects. The series premiered to 4.65 million viewers, and broke records for The CW at the time, becoming their highest rated premiere in viewers and in Adults 18–49 with a 2.6 rating. On September 22, 2008, after airing just four episodes, the network gave the series a full-season order of 24 episodes.

Season one regular cast members include Rob Estes, Shenae Grimes, Tristan Wilds, Jessica Stroup, Dustin Milligan, Ryan Eggold, AnnaLynne McCord, Michael Steger, Lori Loughlin, and Jessica Walter. Along with special guests from the original series, Jennie Garth, Shannen Doherty, and Tori Spelling. In the thirteenth episode, Walter left the series and Jessica Lowndes was promoted to a series regular due to "financial reasons". The CW also hired Rebecca Sinclair to re-tool the series as head writer. She took over completely as executive producer by the end of the season, after Sachs and Judah resigned.

The season finale aired on May 19, 2009, and was seen by 2.00 million viewers. The season averaged 2.24 million viewers and a 0.9 rating in the Adults 18–49 demographic.

Cast

Regular

 Rob Estes as Harry Wilson (23 episodes)
 Shenae Grimes as Annie Wilson (24 episodes)
 Tristan Wilds as Dixon Wilson (24 episodes)
 AnnaLynne McCord as Naomi Clark (24 episodes)
 Dustin Milligan as Ethan Ward (24 episodes)
 Ryan Eggold as Ryan Matthews (18 episodes)
 Jessica Stroup as Erin Silver (24 episodes)
 Michael Steger as Navid Shirazi (19 episodes)
 Lori Loughlin as Debbie Wilson (24 episodes)
 Jessica Walter as Tabitha Wilson (13 episodes)
 Jessica Lowndes as Adrianna Tate-Duncan1 (23 episodes)

Recurring
 Christina Moore as Tracy Clark (9 episodes)
 Adam Gregory as Ty Collins (9 episodes)
 James Patrick Stuart as Charles Clark (9 episodes)
 Matt Lanter as Liam Court (8 episodes)
 Kellan Lutz as George Evans (6 episodes)
 Patrick James as Jared (6 episodes)
 Brandon Michael Vayda as Mike (5 episodes)
 Jana Kramer as Portia Ranson (4 episodes)
 Sara Foster as Jennifer "Jen" Clark (4 episodes)
 Aimee Teegarden as Rhonda Kimble (3 episodes)
 Josh Henderson as Sean Cavanaugh (3 episodes)
 Lily Collins as Phoebe Abrams (2 episodes)

Special Guest Stars
 Jennie Garth as Kelly Taylor (15 episodes)
 Shannen Doherty as Brenda Walsh (7 episodes)
 Tori Spelling as Donna Martin (2 episodes)
 Ann Gillespie as Jackie Taylor (2 episodes)
 Diablo Cody as herself (1 episode)

 : Jessica Walter is credited as a series regular up until episode 13. From episode 14 onwards she is no longer credited.
 : Jessica Lowndes is credited as a guest star from episodes 1 through to 13. From episode 14 onwards she is credited as a series regular.

Episodes

Production

On March 13, 2008, it was announced that The CW was developing a contemporary spin-off of Beverly Hills, 90210, which first aired on Fox from October 1990 to May 2000. The project was put on the fast track by the network, and an order of the pilot was expected by the end of the month. The Beverly Hills, 90210 creator, Darren Star, was announced not to be involved with the project, as well as producer Aaron Spelling, who died in 2006. The only surviving element from the original series was the Creative Artists Agency, the talent agency which masterminded the spin-off idea. A detailed breakdown of the pilot written by Thomas was released on March 17, containing information on the plot and characters of the series. None of the characters were related to the original series; however, the series' featured a similar premise: a family with two teenagers who recently moved from the Midwest to Beverly Hills. To reflect the situation at the Beverly Hills school, where around 40 percent of the students were from Persian descent, a student named Navid Shirazi was created. Thomas intended to introduce The Peach Pit, the diner from Beverly Hills, 90210, but noted that it would not be featured in the pilot. The writer considered giving the siblings a job at a movie theater, as he did not want them to use their parent's credit cards. On April 14, Thomas announced that he was leaving the series to focus on his two pilots for ABC. Gabe Sachs and Jeff Judah were hired as the new executive producers and wrote a new version of the script in late April. Sachs said that although Thomas had a "great script", their version of the script was edgier.

On May 11, one day before The CW's upfront presentations, the network officially picked up the series for the 2008–2009 television season. The CW gave the series a full-season order after airing just four episodes. After disagreeing with the network executives over the series' storylines, Sachs and Judah resigned as writers. The CW wanted the series to have a female perspective and focus more on money and glamor; however, Judah and Sachs were more comfortable writing for men. Instead, Judah began working on postproduction, including editing and music supervision, while Sachs ran the production on set. The CW hired Rebecca Rand Sinclair to retool the series as head writer. In late February 2009, Sinclair took over as executive producer.

Filming for the series usually took place in numerous high schools in Torrance and El Segundo, although several scenes were filmed in Torrance High School because of its large auditorium.

Cast 
With the press release for The CW's 2008–09 season, Rob Estes, Shenae Grimes, Tristan Wilds, AnnaLynne McCord, Dustin Milligan, Ryan Eggold, Jessica Stroup, Michael Steger, Lori Loughlin and Jessica Walter were announced as the regulars for the first season.

The producers wanted to see "as many of the original cast members as possible", but were careful not to "parade them all out in the pilot". Following rumors of cast members from Beverly Hills, 90210 appearing on the spin-off, The CW confirmed that Shannen Doherty would be returning in a recurring role as her original character. Sachs met with Doherty over dinner, and told her about the 90210 spin-off. Over the next few weeks, they established Brenda's backstory and Doherty agreed to guest star in several episodes. Doherty and Garth told reporters that they were nervous about reuniting and filming scenes together for the 90210 spin-off. While starring in the original series, the actresses were known for feuding on and off the set, which lead to Doherty leaving the series in 1994. The pair had not spoken for years before filming their first scene together, and commented on the amount of buildup and nerves leading towards their first meeting. Doherty commented, "I think when you're 18, your personalities conflict, then you meet up 10 or 15 years later, and the playing ground is totally different and you're fine."

Other guest stars include Kellan Lutz, Meghan Markle, Maeve Quinlan as Adrianna's mother Constance, Josh Henderson as Sean, a young man who claimed to be Harry's biological son with Tracy Clark, but was really a scam artist, Lauren London as cheerleader Christina, and Aimee Teegarden as Rhonda, a West Beverley student.

Jessica Walter was written out of the series in episode thirteen due to "financial reasons," while Jessica Lowndes was upgraded to series regular in her place.

Story 
Jeff Judah said that they were trying to ground their script in reality, with real character stories and emotional stories. The writers wanted the audience to relate to the characters' problems, which they wanted to be truthful and emotional, but also comedic. The pair were interested in telling several stories simultaneously, featuring many characters. Sachs and Judah found the parents to be an important part of the series, and designed to be contemporary parents. Since the producers were both fathers, they designed the script to include more prominent adult story lines and a strong point of view on parenting. Judah was interested in focusing on how the family kept their moral center when moving to Beverly Hills, and the way the parents dealt with their teenagers.

Reception 
The series debuted to 4.7 million viewers and a 2.6 Adults 18–49, winning the night in all key demos, to become The CW's highest rated premiere. It also matched the highest 18–49 numbers set by America's Next Top Model. The season averaged 2.24 million viewers and a 0.9 Adults 18–49 rating in the United States each week. The show also debuted strongly for E4 in the UK, with 468,000 viewers tuning for the pilot episode.

The first season holds a 46/100 rating on Metacritic, indicating generally mixed reviews.

In New Zealand, 90210 debuted on TV3 on October 15, 2008, at 7.30pm then on
November 12, 2008, the show was shifted to Four.

DVD release
The DVD release of season one was released after the season completed broadcast on television. It has been released in Regions 1, 2 and 4. As well as every episode from the season, the DVD release features bonus material such as deleted scenes, gag reels and behind-the-scenes featurettes.

References

2008 American television seasons
2009 American television seasons